was formerly a rural district located in Gunma Prefecture, Japan. The district is now divided between the cities of Isesaki and Maebashi, with a remaining portion forming Sawa District and the town of Tamamura

Nawa District was created on December 7, 1878, with the reorganization of Gunma Prefecture into districts. It included 2 towns (Naka and Shiba), 22.5 villages which were formerly part of the holdings of Isezaki Domain, 9.5 villages which belonged to Maebashi Domain, 1 village each to Yoshii Domain, Takasaki Domain and Iwatsuki Domain, and 20 villages which were part of the tenryō holdings in Kōzuke Province under the direct control of the Tokugawa shogunate. With the establishment of the municipalities system on April 1, 1889, the area was organized as one town (Tamamura) and five villages.

On April 1, 1896, the district was merged with Sai District to form Sawa District

References
 角川日本地名大辞典 10 Gunma Prefecture
 旧高旧領取調帳データベース

Former districts of Gunma Prefecture